Hassatj Halifa (born 1 March 1984) is a Comorian footballer who captains the Comoros women's national team.

International career
Halifa capped for the Comoros at senior level during the 2014 African Women's Championship qualification.

References

1984 births
Living people
Comorian women's footballers
Comoros women's international footballers
Women's association footballers not categorized by position